Grace Clements may refer to:
Grace Clements (athlete) (born 1984), English athlete
Grace Clements (artist) (1905–1969), American painter, mosaicist, and art writer